Mount Hereford is a mountain located in Coaticook Regional County Municipality, Estrie, Quebec, Canada.

Etymology
Mount Hereford is a reference to a city and a county of the same name in England. A dictionary from 1832 refers to it as "Hereford Mountain."

History

Recreation
It is accessible from either Clowery Road in Saint-Herménégilde or Coaticook Road in East Hereford. Other activities permitted include snowshoeing, cross-country skiing, and wildlife observation.

References

External links
 Official website

Mountains of Quebec under 1000 metres
Tourist attractions in Estrie